Tim Grayson (born September 17, 1967) is an American politician serving in the California State Assembly. He is a Democrat representing the 14th Assembly District, encompassing parts of the East Bay and the North Bay, including Concord, Pittsburg, and Pleasant Hill. Although once a Republican, he switched parties upon making a bid for Assembly.  Grayson was a construction contractor before deciding to get involved in politics. Prior to being elected to the Assembly, he was a member of the Concord City Council.

References

External links 
 
 Campaign website

Democratic Party members of the California State Assembly
Living people
People from Concord, California
California city council members
21st-century American politicians
1967 births